Helium was an American alternative rock band fronted by Mary Timony. The band formed during the summer of 1992. Between 1992 and 1997, they released two full-length albums, three EPs and several singles.

History
Under the original moniker of "Chupa," the band's founding members were Mary Lou Lord; Jason Hatfield, Juliana Hatfield's brother; Shawn King Devlin; and Brian Dunton. Devlin and Dunton were both also in the band Dumptruck before founding Helium. Mary Timony, formerly of the band Autoclave, replaced Mary Lou Lord on vocals and guitar shortly after formation, as Lord was reluctant to use electric instrumentation. Following Lord's departure, the remaining members changed the band's name to Helium.

Timony was  known for her husky, vibrato-less and monotone singing style. The band's record label, Matador Records, likened Timony's vocals to Kim Wilde and Debbie Harry.

Releases
Their first release was a 7" single entitled "The American Jean" (1993), which was followed by the 7" "Hole in the Ground". They released their first EP, Pirate Prude, in 1994. Shortly after the release of Pirate Prude, Dunton left the band and Polvo guitarist Ash Bowie, boyfriend of Timony at the time, joined on bass. In 1995, they released their first full-length release, The Dirt of Luck, and played the second stage of Lollapalooza. Adam Lasus produced and engineered The Dirt of Luck, Pirate Prude, and all of Helium's singles up to 1995.

In 1997, the group released the EP No Guitars before releasing their second album, The Magic City. This album featured synths and analog drum sounds, as opposed to their previous guitar-centered releases.

Commenting on the band's new direction, in an interview with the Boston Phoenix in 1997, Timony said: "It seemed natural for a girl my age to be expressing anger in music." For whatever psychological reason, I found it easier to express it in my songs than any other way. Writing out of anger is an easy framework, and that's one reason I don't do it now. I remember hearing Patti Smith say that she stopped playing music because she wasn't angry any more. I could totally relate, except that I want to keep playing. Lately I'm more into the idea that making music is fun. I want it to be a collaborative, creative thing, rather than using music as a tool."

The band toured the United States in early 1998 and disbanded shortly thereafter.

Film and television
The band makes an appearance in the cult 1994 road movie, Half-cocked. On television, two of the band's music videos, "Pat's Trick" and "XXX", were critiqued by Beavis and Butt-head.

Post-Helium
Timony began a solo career in 2000 and Bowie released an album of old four-track recordings under the name Libraness. Timony was later a member of the bands Wild Flag and Ex Hex.

Matador Records reissued the band's two albums in March 2017, along with a new collection of rarities titled Ends With And. Timony consequently played two "Mary Timony Plays Helium" tours in the U.S., backed by members of the band Hospitality, in 2017 and 2018.

Discography

Albums

EP's

Singles

Compilations

Music videos

References

External links
Helium on epitonic
Matador bio
Trouser Press entry

Indie rock musical groups from Massachusetts
Musical groups established in 1992
Musical groups disestablished in 1998
Musical groups from Boston
Noise pop musical groups